Mimi-Johanne Kopperud Slevigen (born 1977) is a Norwegian team handball player.

She made her debut on the Norway women's national handball team in 1999, and played 59 matches for the national team. She received a silver medal at the World Women's Handball Championship in 2001, and a silver medal at the European Championship in 2002.

She resides in Trømborg.

References

1977 births
Living people
Norwegian female handball players